The 29th Luna Awards were held on July 10, 2011 at the Quezon City Sports Club and they honored the best Filipino films of the year 2010. It was held together with the 27th Luna Awards.

The nominations were unveiled on June 3, 2011. Rosario received the most nominations with ten. It also dominated the Best Supporting Actor category by being able to secure 4 out of 5 nominations. Noy followed with eight.

Emir won the Best Picture and another 3 awards. Rosario earned the most awards with five.

Winners and nominees

Special awards

Multiple nominations and awards

References

External links
 Official Website of the Film Academy of the Philippines

Luna Awards
2010 film awards
2011 in Philippine cinema